Mats Facklam (born 22 August 1996) is a German footballer who plays as a forward for VfB Lübeck.

References

External links
 
 

1996 births
Living people
Footballers from Hamburg
German footballers
Association football forwards
SV Eichede players
Sportfreunde Lotte players
FC Eintracht Norderstedt 03 players
Holstein Kiel II players
FC Teutonia Ottensen players
VfB Lübeck players
3. Liga players
Regionalliga players